Lev Romanovich Sheinin (1906-1967) was a Soviet writer, journalist, and NKVD investigator. He was Andrei Vyshinsky's chief investigator during the show trials of the 1930s, and a member of the Soviet team at the Nuremberg trials. In the 1930s he collaborated with psychologist Alexander Luria in researching the emotional reactions of suspected criminals, work that contributed to the development of polygraph testing. In 1951 he was arrested on suspicion of spying, one of the arrests associated with the Doctors' plot.

He wrote Diary of a Criminologist (1945), one of the first Soviet detective novels, along with many other novels, plays, and short stories. His obituary in the New York Times reported that his plays were produced throughout the Eastern Bloc and Diary of a Criminologist was "considered essential reading for law students." He was a member of the Union of Soviet Writers. He died in 1967 at the age of 61.

References

External links
USSR : Soviet Life Today 1960-10: Iss 10 1960 issue of USSR magazine that includes an article by Sheinin

1906 births

1967 deaths
Soviet writers
Soviet lawyers
Great Purge perpetrators
Russian crime fiction writers